The Insect Trust Gazette was a poetry journal published at Temple University in Philadelphia. Three issues appeared from 1964 - 1968. It was edited by Leonard Belasco, Jed Irwin, Robert Basara, and William Levy. 

The journal's name was derived from a phrase in William S. Burroughs' novel Naked Lunch about a "a trust of giant insects from another galaxy." The editors added "gazette" to it.  Burroughs contributed texts to the first two issues. The journal folded in 1968.

A folk/jazz/blues group in the late 1960s, The Insect Trust, took its name from the journal.

References

Poetry magazines published in the United States
Defunct literary magazines published in the United States
Magazines established in 1964
Magazines disestablished in 1968
Temple University
Magazines published in Philadelphia